The 1925 Oklahoma A&M Cowboys football team was an American football team that represented Oklahoma A&M College (later renamed Oklahoma State University) as a member of the Missouri Valley Conference (MVC) during the 1925 college football season.  In its fifth season under head coach John Maulbetsch, the team compiled a 2–5–1 record (0–3–1 against MVC opponents) and was outscored by a total of 115 to 41. The 1925 season was Oklahoma A&M's 25th competing in intercollegiate football and its first as a member of the MVC. The team played its home games at Lewis Field in Stillwater, Oklahoma.

Schedule

References

Oklahoma AandM
Oklahoma State Cowboys football seasons
Oklahoma AandM